Louis IV (1 April 1282 – 11 October 1347), called the Bavarian, of the house of Wittelsbach, was King of the Romans from 1314, King of Italy from 1327, and Holy Roman Emperor from 1328.

Louis' election as king of Germany in 1314 was controversial, as his Habsburg cousin Frederick the Fair was simultaneously elected king by a separate set of electors. Louis defeated Frederick in the Battle of Mühldorf in 1322, and the two eventually reconciled. Louis was opposed and excommunicated by the French Pope John XXII; Louis in turn attempted to depose the pope and install an anti-pope.

Louis IV was Duke of Upper Bavaria from 1294 to 1301 together with his elder brother Rudolf I, was Margrave of Brandenburg until 1323, and Count Palatine of the Rhine until 1329, and became Duke of Lower Bavaria in 1340. He was the last Bavarian to be a king of Germany until 1742. He became Count of Hainaut, Holland, Zeeland, and Friesland in 1345 when his wife Margaret inherited those domains.

Early reign as Duke of Upper Bavaria
Louis was born in Munich, the son of Louis II, Duke of Upper Bavaria and Count Palatine of the Rhine, and Matilda, a daughter of King Rudolph I.

Though Louis was partly educated in Vienna and became co-regent of his brother Rudolf I in Upper Bavaria in 1301 with the support of his Habsburg mother and her brother, King Albert I, he quarreled with the Habsburgs from 1307 over possessions in Lower Bavaria. A civil war against his brother Rudolf due to new disputes on the partition of their lands was ended in 1313, when peace was made at Munich.

In the same year, on November 9, Louis defeated his Habsburg cousin Frederick the Fair who was further aided by duke Leopold I. Originally, he was a friend of Frederick, with whom he had been raised. However, armed conflict arose when the guardianship over the young Dukes of Lower Bavaria (Henry XIV, Otto IV, and Henry XV) was entrusted to Frederick, even though the late Duke Otto III, the former King of Hungary, had chosen Louis. On 9 November 1313, Frederick was defeated by Louis in the Battle of Gammelsdorf and had to renounce the tutelage. This victory caused a stir within the Holy Roman Empire and increased the reputation of the Bavarian Duke.

Election as German King and conflict with Frederick the Fair
The death of Holy Roman Emperor Henry VII in August 1313 necessitated the election of a successor. Henry's son John, King of Bohemia since 1310, was considered by many prince-electors to be too young, and by others to be already too powerful. One alternative was Frederick the Fair, the son of Henry's predecessor, Albert I, of the House of Habsburg. In reaction, the pro-Luxembourg party among the prince electors settled on Louis as its candidate to prevent Frederick's election.

On 19 October 1314, Archbishop Henry II of Cologne chaired an assembly of four electors at Sachsenhausen, south of Frankfurt. Participants were Louis' brother, Rudolph I of the Palatinate, who objected to the election of his younger brother, Duke Rudolph I of Saxe-Wittenberg, and Henry of Carinthia, whom the Luxembourgs had deposed as King of Bohemia. These four electors chose Frederick as King.

The Luxembourg party did not accept this election and the next day a second election was held. Upon the instigation of Peter of Aspelt, Archbishop of Mainz, five different electors convened at Frankfurt and elected Louis as King. These electors were Archbishop Peter himself, Archbishop Baldwin of Trier and King John of Bohemia - both of the House of Luxembourg - Margrave Waldemar of Brandenburg and Duke John II of Saxe-Lauenburg, who contested Rudolph of Wittenberg's claim to the electoral vote.

This double election was quickly followed by two coronations: Louis was crowned at Aachen - the customary site of coronations - by Archbishop Peter of Mainz, while the Archbishop of Cologne, who by custom had the right to crown the new king, crowned Frederick at Bonn. In the following conflict between the kings, Louis recognized in 1316 the independence of Switzerland from the Habsburg dynasty.

After several years of bloody war, victory finally seemed within the grasp of Frederick, who was strongly supported by his brother Leopold. However, Frederick's army was decisively defeated in the Battle of Mühldorf on 28 September 1322 on the Ampfing Heath, where Frederick and 1300 nobles from Austria and Salzburg were captured.

Louis held Frederick captive in Trausnitz Castle (Schwandorf) for three years, but the determined resistance by Frederick's brother Leopold, the retreat of John of Bohemia from his alliance, and a ban by Pope John XXII, who  excommunicated Louis in 1324, induced Louis to release Frederick in the Treaty of Trausnitz of 13 March 1325. In this agreement, Frederick recognized Louis as legitimate ruler and undertook to return to captivity should he not succeed in convincing his brothers to submit to Louis.

As he did not manage to overcome Leopold's obstinacy, Frederick returned to Munich as a prisoner, even though the Pope had released him from his oath. Louis, who was impressed by such nobility, renewed the old friendship with Frederick, and they agreed to rule the Empire jointly. Since the Pope and the electors strongly objected to this agreement, another treaty was signed at Ulm on 7 January 1326, according to which Frederick would administer Germany as King of the Romans, while Louis would be crowned as Holy Roman Emperor in Italy. However, after Leopold's death in 1326, Frederick withdrew from the regency of the Empire and returned to rule only Austria. He died on 13 January 1330.

Coronation as Holy Roman Emperor and conflict with the Pope

After the reconciliation with the Habsburgs in 1326, Louis marched to Italy and was crowned King of Italy in Milan in 1327. Already in 1323, Louis had sent an army to Italy to protect Milan against the Kingdom of Naples, which was together with France the strongest ally of the papacy. But now the Lord of Milan Galeazzo I Visconti was deposed since he was suspected of conspiring with the pope.

In January 1328, Louis entered Rome and had himself crowned emperor by the aged senator Sciarra Colonna, called captain of the Roman people. Three months later, Louis published a decree declaring Pope John XXII (Jacques Duèze), who resided in Avignon, deposed on grounds of heresy. He then installed a Spiritual Franciscan, Pietro Rainalducci as antipope Nicholas V, who soon left Rome and a few years later submitted to Pope John XXII. In the meantime, Robert, King of Naples had sent both a fleet and an army against Louis and his ally Frederick II of Sicily. Louis spent the winter 1328/29 in Pisa and stayed then in Northern Italy. When his co-ruler Frederick of Habsburg died in 1330, Louis returned from Italy.  In fulfillment of an oath, Louis founded Ettal Abbey on 28 April 1330.

Franciscan theologians Michael of Cesena and William of Ockham, and the philosopher Marsilius of Padua, who were all on bad terms with the Pope as well, joined Emperor Louis in Italy and accompanied him to his court at Alter Hof in Munich which became the first imperial residence of the Holy Roman Empire.

In 1333, Emperor Louis sought to counter French influence in the southwest of the empire so he offered Humbert II of Viennois the Kingdom of Arles which was an opportunity to gain full authority over Savoy, Provence, and its surrounding territories. Humbert was reluctant to take the crown due to the conflict that would follow with all around him, so he declined, telling the emperor that he should make peace with the church first.

Emperor Louis also allied with King Edward III of England in 1337 against King Philip VI of France, the protector of the new Pope Benedict XII in Avignon. King Philip VI had prevented any agreement between the Emperor and the Pope. Thus, the failure of negotiations with the papacy led to the declaration at Rhense in 1338 by six electors to the effect that election by all or the majority of the electors automatically conferred the royal title and rule over the empire, without papal confirmation. King Edward III was the Emperor's guest at the Imperial Diet in the Kastorkirche at Coblence in 1338 and was named Vicar-General of the Holy Roman Empire. However in 1341, the Emperor deserted Edward III but came to terms with Philip VI only temporarily. For the expected English payments were missing and Louis intended to reach an agreement with the Pope one more time.

Imperial privileges
Louis IV was a protector of the Teutonic Knights. In 1337 he allegedly bestowed upon the Teutonic Order a privilege to conquer Lithuania and Russia, although the Order had only petitioned for three small territories. Later he forbade the Order to stand trial before foreign courts in their territorial conflicts with foreign rulers.

Louis concentrated his energies also on the economic development of the cities of the empire, so his name can be found in many city chronicles for the privileges he granted. In 1330 the emperor for example permitted the Frankfurt Trade Fair, and in 1340 Lübeck, as the leading member of the Hanseatic League, received the coinage prerogative for golden gulden.

Dynastic policy

In 1323 Louis gave Brandenburg as a fiefdom to his eldest son Louis V after the Brandenburg branch of the House of Ascania had died out. With the Treaty of Pavia in 1329 the emperor reconciled the sons of his late brother Rudolph and returned the Palatinate to his nephews Rudolf and Rupert. After the death of Henry of Bohemia, the duchy of Carinthia was released as an imperial fief on 2 May 1335 in Linz to his Habsburg cousins Albert II, Duke of Austria, and Otto, Duke of Austria, while Tyrol was first placed into Luxemburg hands.

With the death of duke John I in 1340 Louis inherited Lower Bavaria and then reunited the duchy of Bavaria. John's mother, a member of the Luxemburg dynasty, had to return to Bohemia. In 1342 Louis also acquired Tyrol for the Wittelsbach by voiding the first marriage of Margarete Maultasch with John Henry of Bohemia and marrying her to his own son Louis V, thus alienating the House of Luxemburg even more.

In 1345 the emperor further antagonized the lay princes by conferring Hainaut, Holland, Zeeland, and Friesland upon his wife, Margaret II of Hainaut. The hereditary titles of Margaret's sisters, one of whom was the queen of England, were ignored. Because of the dangerous hostility of the Luxemburgs, Louis had increased his power base ruthlessly.

Conflict with Luxemburg

The acquisition of these territories and his restless foreign policy had earned Louis many enemies among the German princes. In the summer of 1346 the Luxemburg Charles IV was elected rival king, with the support of Pope Clement VI. Louis himself obtained much support from the Imperial Free Cities and the knights and successfully resisted Charles, who was widely regarded as a papal puppet ("rex clericorum" as William of Ockham called him). Also the Habsburg dukes stayed loyal to Louis. In the Battle of Crécy Charles' father John of Luxemburg was killed; Charles himself also took part in the battle but escaped.

But then Louis' sudden death avoided a longer civil war. Louis died in October 1347 from a stroke suffered during a bear-hunt in Puch near Fürstenfeldbruck. He is buried in the Frauenkirche in Munich. The sons of Louis supported Günther von Schwarzburg as new rival king to Charles but finally joined the Luxemburg party after Günther's early death in 1349 and divided the Wittelsbach possessions amongst themselves again. In continuance of the conflict of the House of Wittelsbach with the House of Luxemburg, the Wittelsbach family returned to power in the Holy Roman Empire in 1400 with King Rupert of Germany, a great-grandnephew of Louis.

Family and children

In 1308 Louis IV married his first wife, Beatrice of Silesia (1290-1322). Their children were:
 Mathilda (aft. 21 June 1313 – 2 July 1346, Meißen), married at Nuremberg 1 July 1329 Frederick II, Margrave of Meissen (d. 1349)
 Daughter (end September 1314 – died shortly after).
 Louis V, Duke of Bavaria (July 1315 – 17/18 September 1361), duke of Upper Bavaria, margrave of Brandenburg, count of Tyrol
 Anna (c. July 1317 – 29 January 1319, Kastl)
 Agnes (c. 1318 – died shortly after).
 Stephen II (autumn 1319 – 19 May 1375), duke of Lower Bavaria

In 1324 he married his second wife, Margaret II, Countess of Hainaut and Holland (1308-1356).
Their children were:
 Margaret (1325 – 1374), married:
 in 1351 in Ofen Stephen, Duke of Slavonia (d. 1354), son of the King Charles I of Hungary;
 1357/58 Gerlach von Hohenlohe.
 Anna (c. 1326 – 3 June 1361, Fontenelles) married John I of Lower Bavaria (d. 1340).
 Louis VI the Roman (7 May 1328 – 17 May 1365), duke of Upper Bavaria, elector of Brandenburg.
 Elisabeth (1329 – 2 August 1402, Stuttgart), married:
 Cangrande II della Scala, Lord of Verona (d. 1359) in Verona on 22 November 1350;
 Count Ulrich of Württemberg (died 1388 in the Battle of Döffingen) in 1362.
 William V of Holland (12 May 1330 – 15 April 1389), as William I duke of Lower Bavaria, as William III count of Hainaut
 Agnes (Munich, 1335 – 11 November 1352, Munich).
 Albert I of Holland (25 Jul 1336 – 13 December 1404), duke of Lower Bavaria, count of Hainaut and Holland.
 Otto V the Bavarian (1340/42 – 15/16 November 1379), duke of Upper Bavaria, elector of Brandenburg.
 Beatrice (1344 – 25 December 1359), married bef. 25 October 1356 Eric XII of Sweden.
 Louis (October 1347 – 1348).

See also
 Kings of Germany family tree. He was related to every other king of Germany.

References

Books

External links

 Charter given by Louis to the Hospital of the Holy Spirit in Nuremberg taken from the collections of the LBA Marburg

 
 
 
 Veröffentlichungen zu Ludwig IV. im Opac der Regesta Imperii
 Deed by Emperor Louis the Bavarian for the Hospital of the Holy Spirit (Heilig-Geist-Spital) in Nuremberg, 

|-

|-

 
1282 births
1347 deaths
14th-century Holy Roman Emperors
13th-century dukes of Bavaria
14th-century dukes of Bavaria
14th-century viceregal rulers
Counts of Hainaut
Counts of Holland
Counts Palatine of the Rhine
Prince-electors of Brandenburg
House of Wittelsbach
Nobility from Munich
People excommunicated by the Catholic Church
Burials at Munich Frauenkirche